Switzerland participated at the 2018 Summer Youth Olympics in Buenos Aires, Argentina from 6 October to 18 October 2018.

Athletics

Beach volleyball

Cycling

Switzerland qualified a boys' and girls' combined team based on its ranking in the Youth Olympic Games Junior Nation Rankings. They also qualified a mixed BMX racing team based on its ranking in the Youth Olympic Games BMX Junior Nation Rankings.

 Boys' combined team - 1 team of 2 athletes
 Girls' combined team - 1 team of 2 athletes
 Mixed BMX racing team - 1 team of 2 athletes

Diving

Golf

Individual

Team

Gymnastics

Trampoline
Switzerland qualified one gymnast based on its performance at the 2018 European Junior Championship.

 Girls' trampoline - 1 quota

Multidiscipline

Modern pentathlon

Switzerland qualified one athlete based on its performance at the 2018 Youth A World Championship.

 Girls' Individual - Anna Jurt

Rowing

Switzerland qualified one boat based on its performance at the 2017 World Junior Rowing Championships. Later, they qualified one girls' boat based on its performance at the 2018 European Rowing Junior Championships.

 Boys' single sculls - 1 boat
 Girls' single sculls - 1 boat

Sailing

Switzerland qualified one boat based on its performance at the 2018 World Championship.

 Mixed Nacra 15 - 1 boat

Shooting

Switzerland qualified one sport shooter based on its performance at the 2018 European Championships. 

 Boys' 10m Air Pistol - 1 quota

Individual

Team

Sport climbing

Swimming

Tennis

Singles

Doubles

Triathlon

Switzerland qualified two athletes based on its performance at the 2018 European Youth Olympic Games Qualifier.

Individual

Relay

References

2018 in Swiss sport
Nations at the 2018 Summer Youth Olympics
Switzerland at the Youth Olympics